Robert J. "Bob" Whidden (born July 27, 1946) is a Canadian former professional ice hockey player and high school ice hockey coach. He played goaltender. He was born in Sudbury, Ontario and was involved in ice hockey in various capacities for over fifty years.

Playing career
Whidden played junior hockey with the Toronto Marlboros of the Ontario Hockey Association (OHA) from 1965 to 1967. In 1967, the Marlboros won the J. Ross Robertson Cup (OHA championship) and the Memorial Cup (Canadian Major Junior championship). He played four years with the Cleveland Crusaders of the World Hockey Association as the back-up to future Hall-of-Famer Gerry Cheevers. He also played with the Rochester Americans and Baltimore Clippers of the American Hockey League, the Charlotte Checkers of the Eastern Hockey League, and the Mohawk Valley Comets of the North American Hockey League.

Coaching
Whidden spent 21 years as the coach of the hockey team at St. Edward High School in Lakewood, Ohio, a suburb of Cleveland. In 1985, his first year as head coach, Whidden led the team to the Ohio High School Athletic Association (OHSAA) State "big school" hockey championship. He coached several players who were drafted by the NHL, including Todd Harkins, Brett Harkins, and Michael Rupp.

Whidden's Eagles won ten OHSAA state titles and seven Baron Cups (Greater Cleveland Championships), and finished with a career record of 507-149-28. His 507 wins rank fourth among coaches in OHSAA history. He retired in March 2005 after winning the tenth title and being named Ohio High School Hockey Coach of the Year by the National Federation of State High School Associations.

In July 2009, St. Edward named Whidden to the school's Athletic Hall of Fame, class of 2009.

Honours
1967 Memorial Cup Winner (player)
10 OHSAA state titles (coach)
7 Baron Cups (coach)
500 Wins as a high school head coach
Cleveland Hockey Legends Ring of Honor
In 2011, his hometown inducted him into the House of Kin Sudbury Hall of Fame

Personal life
He is married to Irma and has three sons, Rob and Jarrett, both of whom followed in their father's coaching footsteps, and Tyler. Rob took over as head coach of St. Edward's hockey team in 2005 and won the 2008 Ohio state championship. In August 2006, Jarrett was named head coach of Kent State Golden Flashes men's ice hockey team following a minor league career.

References

External links

1946 births
Baltimore Clippers players
Canadian ice hockey goaltenders
Charlotte Checkers (EHL) players
Cleveland Crusaders players
Ice hockey people from Ontario
Living people
Rochester Americans players
Sportspeople from Greater Sudbury
Toronto Marlboros players